OMS Lightning is a Slovak manufacturer and supplier of LED lighting technology. They specialise in design, industrial LED lamps, and luminaries. OMS Lightning was founded in 1995 in Dojč, Slovakia. 93% of production is exported to 120 countries, White Hart Lane stadium in London is illuminated by OMS.

Owners
In March 2017, Slovak businessman and oligarch Ivan Kmotrík obtained a 70% share of the company for an unspecified fee.

References

Lighting brands
Slovak brands
Manufacturing companies of Slovakia
Manufacturing companies established in 1995